L. J. Maxwell (born 1851) was a state legislator in Arkansas. A Republican, he represented Jefferson County, Arkansas in the Arkansas House of Representatives in 1874 and 1875. Another African-American Legislator Ned Hill also served in the House from Jefferson County for the same two year period.

The following year in 1876, Maxwell ran for State Senator but lost to George Haycock.

In 1883 he represented Jefferson County as a delegate at the State Convention. The same year he was appointed as the railway postal clerk.

In 1894 he made another run for representative, but was unsuccessful.

See also
African-American officeholders during and following the Reconstruction era

References

1851 births
Republican Party members of the Arkansas House of Representatives
Date of death unknown
United States Postal Service people
African-American state legislators in Arkansas
People from Jefferson County, Arkansas
African-American politicians during the Reconstruction Era